Carl "Flash" Tundo (born 11 December 1973 in Nairobi) is a rally driver from Kenya. He is a five times winner of the Safari Rally. In 2009 it was a round of the Intercontinental Rally Challenge, making Tundo the first and only Kenyan winner of an IRC round. His co-driver has been Tim Jessop since 2002.

He is the son of Kenyan rally driver Frank Tundo.

He competed twice in the WRC Safari Rally, in 2002 and in 2021.

Race wins
Safari Rally: 2004, 2009, 2011, 2012, 2018
Guru Nanak Rally: 2011, 2012, 2017
East African Safari Classic Rally: 2017 (shared with Ryan Champion)

References

External links
eWRC results

Kenyan rally drivers
1973 births
World Rally Championship drivers
Intercontinental Rally Challenge drivers
Living people
Sportspeople from Nairobi
White Kenyan people